Bartolomeo Pepe (3 November 1962 – 23 December 2021) was an Italian politician.

Biography
A member of the Five Star Movement and then the Federation of the Greens, he served in the Senate of the Republic from 2013 to 2018. 

An avowed anti-vaxxer, Pepe vocally opposed the mandatory vaccination of schoolchildren in Italy, supported the idea of a link between vaccines and autism, and spread a number of conspiracy theories, such as the ones regarding chemtrails. After the outbreak of the COVID-19 pandemic, he called the media coverage and containment measures "ridiculous hysteria" and opposed the subsequent vaccination campaign. He died from COVID-19 on 23 December 2021, at the age of 59.

References

1962 births
2021 deaths
Senators of Legislature XVIII of Italy
Politicians from Naples
Five Star Movement politicians
Federation of the Greens politicians
Italian anti-vaccination activists
Anti-vaccination activist deaths from the COVID-19 pandemic
COVID-19 conspiracy theorists
Deaths from the COVID-19 pandemic in Campania